Art 2 Heart is a non-profit organization (EIN: 06-1685732) located in the Kerrville, Texas, United States that offering art, dance, music, song, and theatre programs for children aged 8–14.

Programs

The Art 2 Heart runs an after school, outreach, and community service program that promote language and literacy growth. The program uses art, dance, drama, poetry and music as education mediums. It uses five character building pillars in the program which are Commitment, Responsibility, Accountability, Vision, and Example (C.R.A.V.E.) to accomplish its goals.

History
Art 2 Heart was started in 2003, founded by Lorraine LeMon. Its office is located in the Doyle School Community Center in Kerrville, Texas.

References

External links
 Art 2 Heart Official Website

Non-profit organizations based in Texas
Community-building organizations
Community organizations